Arfi or ARFI may refer to:

 Acoustic radiation force impulse imaging, a type of ultrasound elastography
 Arfi Lamba, an Indian-born actor, producer, entertainer, philosopher, and humanist
 Said Arfi, a Tanzanian politician 
 Orfi, a village in Iran that is also known as Arfi